La señora joven is a Mexican telenovela produced by Pino Castellanos for Televisión Independiente de México in 1972.

Cast 
Ofelia Medina as Susana Ricarte
  as Leonardo Montiel
Beatriz Aguirre as Señora Ricarte
Eduardo Alcaraz as Federico Ricarte
Julieta Bracho as Rita
Gregorio Casal as Octavio Servin
Rosario Granados as Margarita
Virginia Gutiérrez as Aurorita
Magda Guzmán as Maura Montiel
Alma Muriel as Luisa
María Rivas
Miguel Suarez
Maria Clara Zurita as Soledad Ricarte
Enrique Novi as Andres Montiel
Luis Torner as Simon Montiel
Manuel Rivera
Benny Ybarra
Francisco Muller
Julio Lucerna
Paco Muller
Cristina Moreno as Flora

References

External links 

Mexican telenovelas
1972 telenovelas
Televisa telenovelas
Spanish-language telenovelas
1972 Mexican television series debuts
1972 Mexican television series endings